Murderville is an American comedic murder-mystery streaming television series with improvised elements developed by Krister Johnson for Netflix. The series is based on the BBC Three television series Murder in Successville. Murderville premiered on February 3, 2022 with the release of all six episodes of the first season.

In the original British series, many of the town's residents (including all the murder suspects) are well-known celebrities, played by impersonators. By contrast, in Murderville, the suspects are simply fictional characters.

A Christmas special premiered on December 15, 2022.

Plot
In the town of Murderville, Terry Seattle is a senior detective of the Murderville Police Department and the ex-husband of Rhonda Jenkins-Seattle who works as the chief of police. In each episode, a guest star plays the role of a rookie detective that Rhonda assigns to Terry. However, the guest is not given a script beforehand and must improvise their way through the episode as they try to solve who the true killer is. While two of the suspects are interviewed by Terry and the guest, the other one is usually interviewed by the guest in disguise as Terry feeds the question through an earpiece.

Once all three suspects are in the same room, Rhonda shows up with some police officers as the guest must make their guess on who committed the crime from their clue observations. Rhonda will let the guest know if they are 100% correct or 100% incorrect.

 If the guess is correct, the culprit is taken away by the police.
 If the guess is incorrect, Rhonda fires the guest, reveals the real culprit and the clues, and the real culprit is taken away by the police.

Cast and characters

Main
 Will Arnett as Terry Seattle, a clumsy senior detective who is going through divorce proceeding with Rhonda. He has a hard time getting over the death of his former partner Lori Griffin who dies 15 years prior to the beginning of the series. He also has a tough time getting over his divorce with Rhonda.
 Haneefah Wood as Rhonda Jenkins-Seattle, the chief of police who is in divorce proceedings with Terry
 Lilan Bowden as Amber Kang, a coroner who assists Terry and the respective guest on the murder
 Phillip Smithey as Darren "Daz" Phillips, a detective who starts dating Rhonda and has a poor co-worker relationship with Terry. Smithey did not appear in the holiday special.

Co-stars
These actors only appear as themself for one episode within their respective season:

 Conan O'Brien (season 1)
 Marshawn Lynch (season 1; special guest, special)
 Kumail Nanjiani (season 1)
 Annie Murphy (season 1)
 Sharon Stone (season 1)
 Ken Jeong (season 1)
 Jason Bateman (special)
 Maya Rudolph (special)
 Pete Davidson (special)

Guest stars

Season 1
 Alison Becker as Deb Melton, a former magician's assistant who works as a waitress.
 Mary Hollis Inboden as Kathy, the head of an anti-magician movement.
 David Wain as Magic Melvin, a magician.
 Rob Huebel as:
 Charles Worthington, the son of Cora Washington who succeeds her in the family business.
 Chester Worthington, the son of Cora Washington and the family outcast who is a doomsdayer and has established his bunker as his own independent nation.
 Chadd Worthington, the son of Cora Washington who is a failing influencer.
 Ian Gomez as Kevin Rivera, the former business partner of billionaire Seth Gourley.
 Jay Larson as Brad Torker, a former school jock.
 Erinn Hayes as Lisa Capabianco, a former student.
 Nina Pedrad as Nanette Dubois, a chef.
 Erica Hernandez as Ms. Anya Cortez, a kindergarten teacher.
 John Ennis as Vinnie Palmieri, the crime boss of the Food Truck Mafia.
 Irene White as Dr. Jocelyn Alexander, the hospital administrator.
 Samantha Cutaran as Dr. Maddison Chen, the ex-girlfriend of Sebastian Pierce.
 Josh Banday as Dr. Will Gonzalez, an anesthesiologist.
 Nicole Sullivan as Rebecca Hendricks, an entrepreneur.
 Peter Giles as Seamus Doyle, an incarcerated Irish Mob enforcer.
 Phil LaMarr as Donald Barton, the police commissioner of the Murderville Police Department.

Special
 Kurt Braunohler as Jim Trently, a sportscaster.
 Courtney Parchman as Mia Briggs, the assistant of Johnny Briggs.
 Eliza Coupe as Donna Foccacia, an investor.
 Dennice Cisneros as Angie, the girlfriend of Jim.

Special guest stars
 Jennifer Aniston as Lori Griffin (season 1), Terry's former partner who was murdered 15 years ago. She only appears in a photograph hanging in Terry's office. Aniston is given a "special thanks" credit in the season one finale.
 Sean Hayes as Johnny Blaze (special), a professional football player who is murdered while dressed as Santa Claus
 Tawny Newsome as Mayor Palmer (special), the Mayor of Murderville who helps Terry and the detectives solve the murder of Johnny Blaze.

Episodes

Series overview

Season 1 (2022)

Special (2022)

Production
Krister Johnson serves as showrunner. Anna Drezen, Chadd Gindin, Craig Rowin, Jack Kukoda, Marina Cockenberg, Kerry O'Neill, Hannah Levy, and Adriana Robles also serve as writers. Iain K. Morris and Brennan Shroff shared director duties for each episode. The series was filmed in mid-2021. Murderville was released on February 3, 2022 on Netflix.

Reception
The review aggregator website Rotten Tomatoes reported a 74% approval rating with an average rating of 6.4/10, based on 35 critic reviews. The website's critics consensus reads, "Murdervilles improvisational premise can lead to stretches of dead air, but the moments of spontaneous inspiration are worthwhile—and it helps to have Will Arnett on the case." Metacritic, which uses a weighted average, assigned a score of 65 out of 100 based on 17 critics, indicating "generally favorable reviews".

Kathryn VanArendonk of Vulture praised the show's concept, writing, "Arnett's flexibility and playfulness are key to making Murderville work, but strong celebrity casting is what keeps its fairly predictable shtick from getting boring."

The Guardians Jack Seale felt that the original BBC series "was a startling flash of bottled chaos that deserves to be cherished. It doesn't deserve the new US remake, Murderville (Netflix), which hacks off the concept's eccentric rough edges, then makes a mess of the less interesting show that's left."

See also
 Thank God You're Here - American version of an Australian TV series with a similar concept.

References

External links
 
 

2022 American television series debuts
2020s American crime television series
2020s American police comedy television series
2020s American mystery television series
English-language Netflix original programming
American television series based on British television series
Television series by Tiger Aspect Productions
Murder in television
Improvisational television series